Bid Gijeh (also Romanized as Bīd Gījeh and Bīd Kījeh) is a village in Qaedrahmat Rural District, Zagheh District, Khorramabad County, Lorestan Province, Iran. At the 2006 census, its population was 164, in 33 families.

References 

Towns and villages in Khorramabad County